is the second live video album by Japanese band Wagakki Band, released on March 23, 2016, by Avex Trax in four editions: two-disc DVD, single-disc Blu-ray, and both editions with two-disc Audio CDs. In addition, an Amazon Japan exclusive release includes a bonus video from the band's 2015 Japan tour. The video covers the band's concert at the Nippon Budokan on January 6, 2016. It also features "Senbonzakura" filmed at different angles featuring each member.

The video peaked at No. 7 on Oricon's DVD chart and No. 11 on Oricon's Blu-ray chart.

Track listing
All tracks are arranged by Wagakki Band.

Personnel 
 Yuko Suzuhana – vocals
 Machiya – guitar, vocals ("Kyōshū no Sora")
 Beni Ninagawa – tsugaru shamisen
 Kiyoshi Ibukuro – koto
 Asa – bass
 Daisuke Kaminaga – shakuhachi
 Wasabi – drums
 Kurona – wadaiko

Charts

References

External links 
 
  (Avex Group)
 
 

Wagakki Band video albums
2016 live albums
Japanese-language live albums
Avex Group video albums
Albums recorded at the Nippon Budokan